The 1968 UEFA European Football Championship final tournament was held in Italy. This was the third UEFA European Championship, an event held every four years and organised by UEFA. The final tournament took place between 5 and 10 June 1968.

It was in this year that the tournament changed its name from the "European Nations' Cup" to the "European Championship". There were also some changes in the tournament's qualifying structure, with the two-legged home-and-away knock-out stage being replaced by a group phase.

Four countries played in the final tournament, which consisted of the semi-finals, a third place play-off, and the final. The host nation for the finals was selected from the four qualified nations.

Qualification

The qualification competition was played in two stages: a group stage (taking place from 1966 until 1968) and the quarter-finals (played in 1968). There were eight qualifying groups of four teams each with the exception of group 4, which only had three. The matches were played in a home-and-away basis. Victories were worth 2 points, draws 1 point, and defeats 0 points. Only group winners could qualify for the quarter-finals. The quarter-finals were played in two legs on a home-and-away basis. The winners of the quarter-finals would go through to the final tournament.

As of 2024, this is the last European Championship finals not to feature Germany (then West Germany) in it.

Qualified teams

Venues

Squads

Match officials

Final tournament

In all matches but the final, extra time and a coin toss were used to decide the winner if necessary. If the final remained level after extra time, a replay would be used to determine the winner.

All times are local, CEST (UTC+2).

Bracket

Semi-finals

Third place play-off

Final

Statistics

Goalscorers

Awards
UEFA Team of the Tournament

References

External links

 UEFA Euro 1968 at UEFA.com

 
1968
1967–68 in European football
1967–68 in Italian football
1968
June 1968 sports events in Europe